Vyacheslav Vsevolodovich Ivanov (21 August 1929 – 7 October 2017) was a prominent Soviet/Russian philologist, semiotician and Indo-Europeanist probably best known for his glottalic theory of Indo-European consonantism and for placing the Indo-European urheimat in the area of the Armenian Highlands and Lake Urmia.

Early life
Vyacheslav Ivanov's father was Vsevolod Ivanov, one of the most prominent Soviet writers. His mother was an actress who worked in the theatre of Vsevolod Meyerhold. His childhood was clouded by disease and war, especially in Tashkent.

Ivanov was educated at Moscow University and worked there until 1958, when he was fired on account of his sympathy with Boris Pasternak and Roman Jakobson. By that time, he had made some important contributions to Indo-European studies and became one of the leading authorities on Hittite language.

Career
 1959–1961 — head of the Research Group for Machine Translation at the Institute of Computer Technology of the Academy of Sciences of the USSR, Moscow
 1963–1989 — head of the Structural Typology Sector of the Institute of Slavic Studies of the Academy of Sciences of the USSR, Moscow
 1989–1993 — director of the All-Union Library of Foreign Literature in Moscow (VGBIL)
 1989–1995 — chair of the Department of Theory and History of World Culture of the Philosophical Faculty of Moscow State University
 1992–2017 — founding director of Moscow State University's Institute of World Culture
 2003–2017 — founding director of the Russian Anthropological School at the Russian State University for the Humanities in Moscow
 from November 1991 — professor in the Department of Slavic Languages and Literatures and the Program of Indo-European Studies at University of California — Los Angeles; retired in 2015, distinguished research professor since then

The member of the academies of sciences and learned societies: 
 the Russian Academy of Sciences
 the American Academy of Arts and Sciences
 the British Academy
 the Croatian Academy of Sciences and Arts
 the Latvian Academy of Sciences
 the Linguistic Society of America
 the American Philosophical Society

He was elected a full member of the Russian Academy of Sciences in 2000, and he has been a Foreign Fellow of the British Academy since 1977.

Also, in 1989 he was elected to the Supreme Soviet of Russia, but left for the United States soon thereafter.

Scholarly contribution
During the early 1960s, Ivanov was one of the first Soviet scholars to take a keen interest in the development of semiotics. He worked with Vladimir Toporov on several linguistic monographs, including an outline of Sanskrit. In 1962 he joined Toporov and Juri Lotman in establishing the Tartu-Moscow Semiotic School. During the 1970s Ivanov worked with Tamaz Gamkrelidze on a new theory about the Indo-European phonetic system: the famous Glottalic theory. These two academics worked together also on a new theory of Indo-European migrations, during the 1980s, which was most recently advocated by them in Indo-European and Indo-Europeans (1995).

Other interests
In 1965 Vyacheslav Ivanov edited, wrote extensive scholarly comments, and published the first Russian edition of previously unpublished "Psychology of Art" by Lev Vygotsky (the work written in the first half of the 1920s). The second, extended and corrected edition of the book came out in 1968 and included another Vygotsky's unpublished work, his treatise on Shakespeare's Hamlet (written in 1915-1916). The first edition of the book was subsequently translated into English by Scripta Technica Inc. and released by MIT Press in 1971.

Apart from his scholarly pursuits, Vyacheslav Ivanov wrote poetry. He also published several books of memoirs, including two on his acquaintances with Boris Pasternak and Anna Akhmatova.

Selected publications 
 Sanskrit. Moscow: Nauka Pub. House, Central Dept. of Oriental Literature, 1968.
 Borozdy i mezhi. 	Letchworth: Bradda Books, 1971. 351 p.
 with Tamaz V. Gamkrelidze, Indoevropjskij jazyk i indoevropejcy: Rekonstrukcija i istoriko-tipologieskij analiz prajazyka i protokultury. Tiflis: Tiflis University Press 1984. xcvi + 1328 p.
 English translation: Indo-European and the Indo-Europeans: A reconstruction and historical analysis of a proto-language and a proto-culture. 2 vols. Trans. J. Nichols. Berlin–New York: Mouton de Gruyter, 1: 1994, 2: 1995
 with T. V. Gamkrelidze, “The ancient Near East and the Indo-European question: Temporal and territorial characteristics of Proto-Indo-European based on linguistic and historico-cultural data”, Journal of Indo-European Studies vol. 13, no. 1–2 (1985): 3–48.
 with T. V. Gamkrelidze, “The migrations of tribes speaking Indo-European dialects from their original homeland in the Near East to their historical habitations in Eurasia”, Journal of Indo-European Studies vol. 13, no. 1–2 (1985): 9–91.
 Vyacheslav V. Ivanov and Thomas Gamkrelidze, “The Early History of Indo-European Languages”, Scientific American vol. 262, no. 3 (March, 1990): 110-116.
 The archives of the Russian Orthodox Church of Alaska, Aleutian and Kuril Islands (1794—1912): An attempt at a multisemiotic society. Washington, 1996.
 The Russian orthodox church of Alaska and the Aleutian Islands and its relation to native American traditions — an attempt at a multicultural society, 1794—1912. Washington, D.C.: Library of Congress; U.S. G.P.O., 1997.
 (as editor) with Ilia Verkholantseva, eds., Speculum Slaviae Orientalis : Muscovy, Ruthenia and Lithuania in the late Middle Ages. Moscow: Novoe izdatel'stvo, 2005.
 (as editor), Issledovaniia po tipologii slavianskikh, baltiĭskikh i balkanskikh iazykov: preimushchestvenno v svete iazykovykh kontaktov [= Studies in the typology of Slavic, Baltic and Balkan languages: with primary reference to language contact]. St. Petersburg: Aleteĭia, 2013.
 with V. N. Toporov, Mifologiia: statʹi dlia mifologicheskikh ėntsiklopediĭ. Moscow: IASK, Iazyki slavianskikh kulʹtur, 2014.
 Cultural-historical theory and semiotics. In A. Yasnitsky, R. Van der Veer & M. Ferrari (Eds.), The Cambridge handbook of cultural-historical psychology (488-516). Cambridge: Cambridge University Press, 2014.

References

External links
Vyacheslav Vsevolodovich Ivanov, Professor Emeritus. In memoriam 
Biography 
Biography 
Velmezova, Ekaterina; Kull, Kalevi 2011. Interview with Vyacheslav V. Ivanov about semiotics, the languages of the brain and history of ideas. Sign Systems Studies 39(2/4): 290–313.

See also
 Culturology
 Alexander Dobrokhotov
 Aron Gurevich
 Mikhail Gasparov

1929 births
2017 deaths
Moscow State University alumni
Linguists from the Soviet Union
20th-century linguists
Russian philologists
Linguists from Russia
Writers from Moscow
Russian semioticians
Indo-Europeanists
Linguists of Indo-European languages
20th-century Russian historians
Russian orientalists
Hittitologists
Researchers of Slavic religion
Academic staff of Moscow State University
Academic staff of the Russian State University for the Humanities
University of California faculty
Stanford University faculty
Yale University faculty
Full Members of the Russian Academy of Sciences
Fellows of the British Academy
Fellows of the American Academy of Arts and Sciences
Lenin Prize winners
Recipients of the USSR State Prize